Trevor Powers (born March 18, 1989) is an American musician from Boise, Idaho. Powers was initially active as Youth Lagoon from 2010 to 2016, after which he announced he was retiring the project. He returned to music with a new self-titled project in May 2018. In 2022 he took Youth Lagoon out of retirement with the announcement of a new album Heaven Is a Junkyard. Powers' music has been described as electronic and experimental with elements of pop.

As Youth Lagoon
Powers was initially active as Youth Lagoon from 2010 to 2016, and again in 2022. Youth Lagoon's music has been described as neo-psychedelia, and includes elements of Americana and experimental.

Youth Lagoon's debut album, The Year of Hibernation, was released on Fat Possum Records on September 27, 2011. Based on minimalism and hypnotic ambience melded with atmospheric and electronic elements, the debut explored themes such as psychological dysphoria and mental distress.

Powers' second album, Wondrous Bughouse, was released on March 5, 2013, by Fat Possum. It was spawned from what he described as "becoming more fascinated with the human psyche and where the spiritual meets the physical world." During the time he composed the album, Powers became intrigued with the metaphysical universe and blending those ideas with pop music.

Powers' tour in support of Wondrous Bughouse was cut short due to the death of a close friend.

On November 12, 2014, Powers announced, via Twitter, that writing for his third album had been finished. Recording started in January 2015. The July 10, 2015, release of "The Knower", a free single-sided 7" single, marked the announcement of his third album, Savage Hills Ballroom, released on September 25, 2015.

In July 2015, Youth Lagoon announced a US tour in support of Savage Hills Ballroom.

On February 1, 2016, Powers announced on Twitter that his Youth Lagoon project was concluding.

In October 2021 after taking an over-the-counter medication, Powers had a drug reaction so severe it turned his stomach into a “non-stop geyser of acid,” coating his larynx and vocal cords for eight months. “I saw seven doctors and multiple specialists. I lost over thirty pounds. No one could help me,” says Powers. By Christmas, he could no longer speak, turning to text messages and a pen and paper as his only ways to communicate. “I wasn’t sure if I’d ever be able to speak again, yet alone sing,” he says.
“It all felt symbolic in a way,” he adds. “I’d been swallowing fear all my life and now here it was coming back up. I used to think God watches people suffer. Now I know She suffers with you. That changed everything.”

On November 10, 2022, Powers announced via his Instagram page that he would be releasing a new album as Youth Lagoon.

On February 28, 2023, Powers released the first single Idaho Alien of his long awaited new album Heaven Is a Junkyard set to be released June 9th, 2023 on Fat Possum Records.

Under his own name
On May 2, 2018, Powers announced his return to music by issuing a personal letter along with the single "Playwright", his first song release since 2015. The letter elaborated on Power's self-titled project, highlighting the project as a new work.

On May 20, 2018, he announced that he would release his first album under his own name, Mulberry Violence, in late 2018. Powers released two more singles from the forthcoming album, "Ache" and "Plaster Saint" with a newly penned letter providing more insight into the project:

On July 29, 2020, Powers surprise-released his second album as Trevor Powers, titled Capricorn, along with limited-edition cassettes and booklet designed by Los Angeles-based designer Collin Fletcher, who also designed the artwork for the album.

Discography

As Youth Lagoon

Studio albums

The Year of Hibernation (2011, Fat Possum Records)
Wondrous Bughouse (2013, Fat Possum Records)
Savage Hills Ballroom (2015, Fat Possum Records)
Heaven Is a Junkyard (2023, Fat Possum Records)

Singles
Youth Lagoon 7" (2011, Fat Possum Records)
"Mute" promo CD (2013, Fat Possum Records)
"The Knower" 7" (2015, Fat Possum Records)
"Idaho Alien" digital (2023, Fat Possum Records)

As Trevor Powers

Studio albums
 Mulberry Violence (2018, Baby Halo)
 Capricorn (2020, Fat Possum Records)

Singles
 "Playwright" digital (2018, Baby Halo)
 "Ache" digital (2018, Baby Halo)
 "Plaster Saint" digital (2018, Baby Halo)

External links
 Trevor Powers Website

References

American pop musicians
Fat Possum Records artists
Musicians from Idaho
Musicians from San Diego
People from Boise, Idaho
1989 births
Living people